The 1938 Manhattan Jaspers football team was an American football team that represented Manhattan College as an independent during the 1938 college football season.  In its first season under head coach Herb Kopf, the team compiled a 5–4 record and outscored opponents by a total of 93 to 70.

Schedule

References

Manhattan
Manhattan Jaspers football seasons
Manhattan Jaspers football